Bong Kee Chok (4 October 1937 – 6 February 2023) was a Malaysian political activist who was the main leader of the North Kalimantan Communist Party (NKCP).

North Kalimantan Communist Party (NKCP)
As Bong was opposed to the formation of Malaysia, he was arrested on 22 June 1962. After his release, Bong formed the NKCP on 19 September 1965 in Pontianak, West Kalimantan, Indonesia.

Insurgencies
On 27 May 1972, Bong led a small group of cadre and a team of self-defense force from Second Division of Sarawak Sri Aman Division  to a communist base at Samarahan Division to attend a central committee meeting.

Decline
After a series of insurgencies, and the Indonesians' decision to stop aiding the Communists, Bong decided to surrender and signed an agreement to lay down arms to Sarawak Chief Minister Abdul Rahman Ya'kub on 20 October 1973 which signified the end of further major battles in the Sarawak Communist Insurgency.

Aftermath
After the Sri Aman treaty was signed, the local population, especially the people of the town of Simanggang (known as Sri Aman from 1974 to 2019) generally held skeptical attitude towards Bong, accusing him of collaborating with the government for material wealth. Bong also retreated from the public view since then.

After laying down his arms, Bong worked as a rubber tapper, and a hawker, sold insurance, and later started a pig-rearing business.

In 2014, Bong paid a visit to a former head of Special Branch Sarawak during Hari Raya celebration, Dato Sri Alli Kawi, 40 years after they met for a peace talk on 20 October 1973.

Bong went for alumni gathering with ten of his classmates in October 2018 at his alma mater St Jospeh secondary school, Kuching.

Bong suffered a stroke in April 2022.

Death
Bong passed away in his sleep at 6 am on 7 February 2023 at his own residence. He survived by four children. Bong's wife passed away earlier in 2019.

References 

1937 births
2023 deaths
Malaysian communists
People from North Kalimantan